The Chinese Consolidated Benevolent Association and Victoria Chinese Public School Chinese: (中華會館和域多利華僑公立學校）  is a historic building is located in the downtown core of Victoria, British Columbia, Canada.

The Chinese Public School was built in 1909 by the Chinese Consolidated Benevolent Association (CCBA) in response to the racial and cultural segregation imposed by the school board and government, which banned Chinese students from City schools until they spoke English. The school continues to provide Cantonese and Mandarin-language education.

See also
 List of historic places in Victoria, British Columbia

References

External links
 
 Victoria Chinese Public School website

1909 establishments in British Columbia
Schools in Victoria, British Columbia
School buildings completed in 1909